Giorgos Panousopoulos is a Greek cinematographer, film director and screenwriter. He worked on 37 films between 1964 and 2004. His 1985 film Mania was entered into the 36th Berlin International Film Festival. His 1988 film Love Me Not? was entered into the 46th Venice International Film Festival.

Filmography

As director
 Honeymoon (1979)
 Oi Apenanti (1981)
 Mania (1985)
 Love Me Not? (1988)
 Eleftheri Katadysi (1995)
 Mia Mera ti Nyhta (2001)
 Testosteroni (2004)

References

External links

1942 births
Living people
Greek cinematographers
Greek film directors
Greek screenwriters
Film people from Athens